The Bridge of Ha! Ha! Lake spans the Ha! Ha! River since 1934. It would be the only covered bridge in Quebec whose paneling is in corrugated iron.

History 
The bridge was built in 1934.

The covered bridge was cited heritage site with the adjacent rest area by the Municipality of Ferland-et-Boilleau on September 12, 2011.

As of August 1st 2015, this covered bridge is closed to traffic.

Toponymy 
The name of Ha! Ha! refers to the river and lake of the same name.

Color 
The bridge is currently green with white moldings. It was formerly white with red moldings.

Notes and references

Bibliography 
 
 

Bridges in Quebec
Bridges completed in 1934
1934 establishments in Quebec